United Left–Greens of the Region of Murcia (. IU–V–RM) is the Murcian federation of the Spanish left wing political and social movement United Left. José Luis Álvarez-Castellanos and Candi Marín are the current General Coordinators. The major member of the coalition is the Communist Party of the Region of Murcia (PCRM, Murcian federation of the Communist Party of Spain).

Election results
 Regional Assembly of Murcia

See also
United Left (Spain)
Communist Party of the Region of Murcia

References

External links
Official page

Murcia
Political parties in the Region of Murcia